Don Turnbull may refer to:

Don Turnbull (game designer) (1937–2003), British journalist, editor, games designer
Don Turnbull (tennis) (1909–1994), Australian tennis player